Anatoly Ivanovich Savenko (28 December 1874 in Pereiaslav, Poltava Governorate, Russian Empire – 1922 in Kerch, Russian SSR) was a Russian nationalist, social and political activist, lawyer, writer, essayist and journalist.

Author of numerous publications of a political and economic nature published in a number of newspapers: "Kievlyanin", "Kievskoye slovo" in the magazine "Life and Art" (as a staff member), in the newspapers "Podolyanin", "Svet", "Moskovskiye Vedomosti", "Novoye Vremya", "Odessa Leaf" and others.

Founder and chairman of the Law and Order (1905-1906). Co-founder and deputy chairman (from 1912 onwards, chairman) of the Kiev Club of Russian Nationalists (1908-1918), a member of the All-Russian National Union (1912-1918) and its General Council (1912-1915). IV State Duma deputy in the nationalist faction and the moderate right (1912-1915). One of the organizers and leaders of the parliamentary faction of progressive nationalists (1915-1917). Commissar of the Provisional Committee of the State Duma and the Provisional Government. Deputy chairman of Russian voters, nonpartisan unit (1919).

One of the main ideologists of Russian nationalism.
Critic and implacable political opponent of Ukrainian nationalism.

He wrote the booklet "Little Russians or Ukrainians?" (1919), and founded the newspaper "Kievan Rus" (1919). Savenko emigrated from Russia in 1920, but the following year he returned secretly to Soviet Russia, where he lived under a false name before his death in Kerch in 1922.

References 

1874 births
1922 deaths
People from Pereiaslav
People from Poltava Governorate
Russian nationalists
People of the Russian Civil War
Taras Shevchenko National University of Kyiv alumni
Lawyers from the Russian Empire